Kenneth Campbell (born June 17, 1983) known by his stage name Young Scrilla, Scrilla, or Scrillz, is an American rapper from Atlanta, Georgia. Scrilla has been active since 2006, and is a member of the Atlanta-based entertainment group, No Line Gang. He is also a former member of Young Jeezy's label CTE World. He posted via Twitter that he is no longer part of CTE World on December 31, 2012.

Early life
Scrilla was born and raised in Atlanta, Georgia and grew up on Campbellton Road in Atlanta's zone 4.  Scrilla started rapping at the young age of 11, and in 2007 Scrillz won the BMI Urban Showcase.

Career
Ben Hill Beast
In 2008, Scrilla made his debut mixtape Ben Hill Beast with direction from Franklin Family Entertainment, Don Music Group, and Nitti.  Ben Hill Beast was a free release on the internet.

Smoke & Mirrors
On April 20, 2011, Scrilla released Smoke & Mirrors (host Black Bill Gates) on the internet for free, which featured the remix to "I Ball, I Stunt" featuring CTE World President Young Jeezy.   Shortly after Smoke & Mirrors was released Scrilla signed to CTE World.

The Demonstration
On June 19, 2012, Scrilla had his first and only full-length release with CTE World The Demonstration(host Bigga Rankin) which had production and feature collaborations with Southside, Killer Mike, Young Jeezy, SuperCed, Freddie Gibbs, and more.   On December 31, 2012, Scrilla announced via Twitter that he was leaving Jeezy's CTE World label, but he also expressed that there were "no hard feelings".

Influences

Scrilla states his influences to be artists such as 2Pac, Young Jeezy, Michael Jackson, Killer Mike, Jay-Z, Anthony Hamilton, and many others.

Discography

Mixtapes
Ben Hill Beast (2008)
Smoke & Mirrors (2011)
The Demonstration (2012)

References

1983 births
African-American male rappers
Living people
Rappers from Atlanta
Southern hip hop musicians
21st-century American rappers
21st-century American male musicians
21st-century African-American musicians
20th-century African-American people